Welcome to Sky Valley (also known as Sky Valley and Kyuss) is the third studio album by American rock band Kyuss. It was released on June 28, 1994, through Elektra and Chameleon Records.

Background and composition
Welcome to Sky Valley was recorded in early 1993 and scheduled for release in January 1994. They sneak-previewed the completed album at Foundations Forum 93 and contributed the song "Demon Cleaner" to the sampler disc. Due to mild success from their previous album, Kyuss had been promoted from their subsidiary record label "Dali" to the main label "Chameleon". On November 11, 1993 Chameleon Records abruptly shut down. Their joint-venture partner Elektra quickly picked up the band and scheduled the album for release in March 1994. The album was then delayed for another three months after that, eventually being released almost a year after being initially recorded.

Welcome to Sky Valley has been described as stoner rock and stoner metal. This is the first Kyuss album to feature bassist Scott Reeder, who replaced Nick Oliveri in 1992. Welcome to Sky Valley was the last to feature founding member Brant Bjork. The song "N.O." was originally recorded by Across the River, a band fronted by Mario Lalli and featuring bassist Reeder. After Reeder left the Obsessed and joined Kyuss, Bjork suggested they record "N.O." as a tribute to Across the River.

Release
On CD, Welcome to Sky Valley was originally released with its ten total songs contained in three tracks, with an additional, fourth hidden track. It was later re-released with all ten tracks separated individually. However, most commercially sold versions of the compact disc contain the three tracks, a setup which is meant to encourage listeners to experience it as a full album instead of as a collection of separate songs. Guitarist Josh Homme claimed in an interview that the band "just wanted it to be like hell to play on a CD player". The album's liner notes instruct the listener to "Listen without distraction".

The band Tool covered "Demon Cleaner" live twice (albeit with slight lyrics changes), with bassist Scott Reeder joining them onstage during the performances: March 27, 1998 in Los Angeles, California, at The Hollywood Palladium, March 29, 1998 in San Diego, California, at The Rimac Theatre. The song is also featured in the video games Guitar Hero: Metallica and The Crew.

Track listing

Personnel
Credits adapted from the album's liner notes.

Kyuss
John Garcia – lead vocals, producer
Josh Homme – guitar, backing vocals, producer
Scott Reeder – bass, acoustic bass in "Space Cadet", backing vocals, producer
Brant Bjork – drums, producer

Additional performers
Peter Moffett – additional percussion on "Asteroid"
"Madman of Encino" – backing vocals
Mario Lalli – lead guitar on "N.O."

Production
Chris Goss – producer
Joe Barresi – recording engineer, mixing engineer
Jeff Sheehan – assistant engineer
Wade Norton – assistant engineer
Alexe Campbell – assistant engineer
Brian Jenkins – additional engineering
Eddy Schreyer – mastering engineer

Artwork
Alex Solca – photography
Skiles – art director

Charts

References

1994 albums
Albums produced by Chris Goss
Albums recorded at Sound City Studios
Elektra Records albums
Kyuss albums